Jacques Fernique (born 13 November 1961) is a French politician and a member of Europe Écologie–The Greens.

He is regional councillor in Alsace for Europe Écologie–The Greens. In 2009, he was selected to be Europe Écologie–The Greens candidate in Alsace for the 2010 regional elections.
He was elected Senator for Bas-Rhin on September 27, 2020.

References

1961 births
Living people
French general councillors
Europe Ecology – The Greens politicians
People from Haguenau
Politicians from Grand Est
French Senators of the Fifth Republic